Noordoostpolder is a polder and municipality in the Flevoland province in the central Netherlands. Formerly, it was also called Urker Land. Emmeloord is the administrative center, located in the heart of the Noordoostpolder.

For history, see Zuiderzee Works.

Population centres
The population centres are Bant, Creil, Emmeloord, Ens, Espel, Kraggenburg, Luttelgeest, Marknesse, Nagele, Rutten, and Tollebeek.

The former island of Schokland is now a museum.

The town and former island of Urk, in the southwest, now surrounded by the Noordoostpolder, is a separate municipality.

Topography

Dutch topographic map of the municipality of Noordoostpolder, June 2015

Rail links
There are no railway stations in the Noordoostpolder, but the nearest stations are in Kampen, Steenwijk and Lelystad. From 9 December 2012, with the opening of the Hanzelijn, Dronten and Kampen Zuid, will be even closer.

UNESCO World Heritage sites
UNESCO World Heritage sites located in/near the Noordoostpolder:
 Schokland and Surroundings (municipality Noordoostpolder)
 Ir.D.F. Woudagemaal (D.F. Wouda Steam Pumping Station), Lemmer (mun. Lemsterland)

Notable people 

 David T. Runia (born 1951 in Noordoostpolder) a Dutch-Australian classical scholar and educational administrator
 Aucke van der Werff (born 1953 in Schettens) politician, current Mayor of Noordoostpolder
 Rien van der Velde (born 1957 in Nagele) a Dutch politician
 Stef Blok (born 1964 in Emmeloord) accountant and politician, Minister of Foreign Affairs
 Marriët Schuurman (born 1969 in Creil) the current Dutch Human Rights' Ambassador
 Ernst Meisner (born 1982 in Noordoostpolder) a Dutch dancer and choreographer

Sport 

 Annamarie Thomas (born 1971 in Emmeloord) a Dutch former speed skater
 Rob Wielaert (born 1978 in Emmeloord) a Dutch footballer
 Diederik Boer (born 1980 in Emmeloord) a Dutch football goalkeeper. 
 Orlando Wirth (born 1981 in Emmeloord) a Dutch footballer
 Tjeerd Korf (born 1983 in Emmeloord) a Dutch former professional footballer
 Corinne Nugter (born 1992 in Emmeloord) a Dutch athlete specialising in the discus throw
 Femke Beuling (born 1999 in Emmeloord) a Dutch speed skater

See also
 Noordoostpolder Airport

References

External links

Official Website

 
Former municipalities of Overijssel
Municipalities of Flevoland
Polders of Flevoland
Regions of Flevoland
Regions of the Netherlands
Zuiderzee Works